An Internet Data Exchange (IDX, also known as Information Data Exchange) refers to the agreement between listing (Selling) Agents or Brokers and Buyers' Agents to display Multiple Listing Service properties online, across multiple websites (via Real Estate Syndication where the listing Agent/Broker allows a listing to be Syndicated).

IDX search users are home buyers or sellers in the market to buy or sell real estate. Their interests may focus on new development, land, condos, rentals, and any other property listed by a particular MLS. 

Real estate agents use IDX to market homes, attract leads, and close more sales.  By displaying listings online, agents can reach a larger audience and better match available homes to prospective buyers.

Certain rules apply to the real estate companies' ability to display each detail about a property. These "display rules" are set by the Multiple Listing Service organization, which generally forms its policy around the recommendations of the National Association of Realtors. Pricing for IDX services is set by MLS boards and third-party vendors. In some cases basic IDX services are free, and premium features are available for a fee.

IDX implementations and standards have changed drastically over recent years, as brokers and agents using IDX services along with companies proving IDX services have focused on the inherent ability to optimize websites with IDX-driven listing content. A variety of options for displaying IDX content on individual websites exist, including the practice of "truly embedding" IDX content into pages to iframe-driven implementations, which some consider a hidden implementation, since the true site delivering the IDX service is only framed into another website. Policies around these implementations as well as IDX content on social media is a hot topic in many circles.

An alternative policy called the Internet Listing Display was considered in 2005, but later abandoned in the same year as a result of investigation from the U.S. Department of Justice into anti-competitive practices by traditional real estate brokers.

A common and standard data exchange protocol for IDX information is the Real Estate Transaction Standard (RETS).

See also
Internet Listing Display (ILD)
Multiple listing service (MLS)
Real Estate Transaction Standard (RETS)
Virtual Office Website (VOW)

References

https://www.kumkvj.com/2021/06/Web-Information-Trade-Internet-Data-Exchange.html==External links==
IDX (Internet Data Exchange) Information and Resources, National Association of Realtors (This site requires a NAR membership.)
RESO

Real estate in the United States
Data interchange standards
Online real estate databases